Vellamperambur is a village in Thanjavur District, Tamil Nadu, India.

References

Villages in Thanjavur district